James Plotkin is an American guitarist and producer known for his role in bands such as Khanate and OLD but with an extensive catalogue outside these bands. He has played guitar for Phantomsmasher and Scorn and continues to remix tracks for bands such as KK Null, Nadja, Sunn O))), ISIS, Pelican and Earth. He works in the genres of grindcore, industrial metal, noise music, drone metal, dark ambient, digital hardcore and post-metal.

Discography

Solo work
James Plotkin - A Strange, Perplexing - 1996
James Plotkin - The Joy Of Disease - 1996
James Plotkin / Pole - Split Series #8 (withdrawn version) - 2000
James Plotkin / Pimmon - Split Series #8 - 2000
James Plotkin - Kurtlanmak/Damascus - 2006
James Plotkin - Indirmek - 2007

Collaborative releases
James Plotkin & Kazuyuki K Null - Aurora - 1994
Jimmy Plotkin & Alan Dubin (2× self-titled 7-inches) - 1995
James Plotkin & K.K. Null - Aurora Remixes - 1996
James Plotkin & Mick Harris - Collapse - 1996
James Plotkin & Mark Spybey - A Peripheral Blur - 1999
James Plotkin & Brent Gutzeit - Mosquito Dream - 1999
James Plotkin & David Fenech - Strings and Stings compilation - 1999
James Plotkin & Tim Wyskida - 8 Improvisations - 2006
James Plotkin & Paal Nilssen-Love - Death Rattle - 2013

With OLD
Old Lady Drivers - 1988
Assück / O.L.D. - Split - 1990
Lo Flux Tube - 1991
The Musical Dimensions Of Sleastak - 1991
Hold On To Your Face - 1993
Formula - 1995

With Scorn
Evanescence - 1994
Anamnesis - Rarities 1994 - 1997

With Namanax
Audiotronic - 1997
Monstrous - 1998
Gummo - o/s/t 199?

With Flux
Protoplasmic - 1997

With Khanate
Khanate- 2001
Live WFMU 91.1 - 2002
No Joy (Remix) - 2003
Things Viral - 2003
KHNTvsSTOCKHOLM - 2004
Live Aktion Sampler - 2004
Capture & Release - 2005
It's Cold When Birds Fall From The Sky - 2005
Clean Hands Go Foul - 2009

With Phantomsmasher
Phantomsmasher - Atomsmasher - 2001
Phantomsmasher  s/t - 2002
Phantomsmasher - Podsjfkj Pojid Poa w/ Venetian Snares remix (7-inch EP) - 2002

With Khlyst
Chaos Is My Name  cd - 2006
Chaos Live DVD - 2008

With Jodis
Secret House  cd/2xlp - 2009
Black Curtain cd/lp - 2012

External links 
 James Plotkin's homepage

American heavy metal guitarists
American heavy metal bass guitarists
Living people
Guitarists from New Jersey
American experimental guitarists
American male bass guitarists
American experimental musicians
American industrial musicians
American noise musicians
Dark ambient musicians
Khanate (band) members
Rune Grammofon artists
Khlyst (band) members
Year of birth missing (living people)
OLD (band) members
Mastering engineers
Utech Records artists